King's Way or the Allan King Way is a  footpath in Hampshire, England. This footpath was created by the Hampshire Area of the Ramblers' Association as a memorial to the late Allan King a former Publicity Officer who was partly responsible for the formation of a number of Groups in Hampshire. The route runs from Portchester to Winchester via Bishops Waltham and passes by sites such as Portchester Castle, Fort Nelson and Bishops Waltham Palace

The footpath is waymarked by metal and plastic disks found attached to wooden and metal posts, trees and street furniture, marked "Allan Kings Way". Where the route coincides with the same route as other long-distance paths, the waymarking is not continuous. There is a free downloadable guide book to the route available on the Eastleigh Ramblers web site.

This route is shown as a series of green diamonds on Ordnance Survey 1:25,000 maps and as a series of red diamonds on Ordnance Survey 1:50,000 maps.

External links
 The Allan King Way, Hampshire by Richard Kenchington
Walking on the Web
Videos of the King's Way

See also

Long-distance footpaths in the UK

Footpaths in Hampshire
Long-distance footpaths in England